State Route 273 (SR 273) is a primary state highway in the U.S. state of Virginia. Known as Farmers Drive, the state highway runs  from SR 30 in Barhamsville north to SR 30 and SR 33 at Eltham. SR 273 is the old alignment of SR 30 in eastern New Kent County.

Route description

SR 273 begins at an intersection with SR 30 (New Kent Highway) in Barhamsville. The state highway heads northeast as a two-lane undivided road through a mix of farmland and forest. As it approaches the York River, SR 273 veers north and parallels the river. The state highway crosses Mill Creek before reaching its northern terminus at SR 30 and SR 33 (Eltham Road) in Eltham, a short distance west of the Pamunkey River, which forms the York River in confluence with the Mattaponi River at West Point.

Major intersections

References

External links

Virginia Highways Project: VA 273

273
State Route 273